Nakaza Island is a small island of the Solomon Islands, located within the Western Province of the nation.

Geography
The island is located 7 km north of Ranongga Island. It is 160 m long and 80 m wide, and sits on a 3 km long coral atoll.

The island is covered in tropical native plants.

See also

References

Atolls of the Solomon Islands
Islands of the Solomon Islands
Western Province (Solomon Islands)